LISD is an acronym that may refer to:

Lichtenstein Institute on Self-Determination at Princeton University
Independent School Districts in Texas